SixTwoSeven is an American alternative rock and roll band out of Gig Harbor, Washington created by Greg Bilderback. Bilderback later brought Michael Knapp in to help produce. Also playing bass Knapp helped Bilderback establish the original line up of SixTwoSeven in 2016. After bringing in Drummer David Cook, Bilderback & Knapp brought in siblings Jason and Matt Bilderback before heading into the studio. In spring of 2016 SixTwoSeven recorded their first EP with DubSeven Records at A Soundhouse Studio in Seattle Washington with Legendary Sub Pop Producer Jack Endino. The release of the EP titled Some Others Day came in August that same year. After their first West Coast Tour with Texas band Drive On Mak they headlined Rock Shows from Portland to L.A., including a stop in Roswell New Mexico for the International Film Festival of 2017 (where the band was nominated for a ROSSI Award for Best Rock Band). Tour plans took the band back to L.A. in the summer of 2017 appearing at the world famous Whisky a Go Go with Agent Orange. DubSeven Records subsequently released a promotional video of this entire 30 minute performance. Plans were leaked from DubSeven Headquarters that a full-length LP was to be released in winter of 2018. The LP titled Already Gone / Dead on the Table was released in September (29th) after a string of singles and B sides throughout the summer of 2018, which included an "on-board" music video for New Solutions where Bilderback is seen skateboarding. The record debuted at #497 on the College Radio Charts, and broke into the top 150 the first week of October at #141, reaching as high as #135. It was produced by illfunk, mastred by Endino, and released on DubSeven Records. In late 2020 DubSeven Records and SixTwoSeven dropped a series of singles and videos starting with The Mistrial / Motormouth, Small Craft Advisory / An Engineer's Lament (Halloween Video), and One Night Stand / Escape Clause.

History
SixTwoSeven released their debut EP Some Other's Day courtesy of DubSeven Records, on August 5, 2016. SixTwoSeven is a five piece rock band composed of Greg "illfunk" Bilderback on guitar and vocals, Jason "J Danger" Bilderback on rhythm guitar, Mike "MK Ultra" Knapp on the bass, Dave "Dee Cee" Cook on Drums, and another Bilderback brother, Matt "the Machine" Bilderback on keys and vocals.

The band formed in 2016 after "illfunk" had been pushing the Self Produced Demo "Allow me for a moment...if you will...to be Frank" on the web for several years. The demo, featuring 7 songs recorded and played entirely by Bilderback (Greg) himself, began gaining notoriety online, and prompted him to put together a live show line up, and by mid March 2016 videos began surfacing of the 3 piece performing live. By the end of March a decision was made to add J Danger to the line up for the recording and ensuing tour. A few short weeks later, while in the studio recording "Some Other's Day" with Nirvana Producer Jack Endino at Soundhouse Studios in Seattle (also known for his work with Mudhoney, and Soundgarden), another Bilderback was brought in. Initially thought just to provide support for backing vocal tracks on the CD, the band and Endino fell in love with Matt's harmonic contributions, and shortly there after a Nord Stage Keyboard Sponsorship was awarded to the Machine so that he could join the band on stage. The album was mastered by Grammy Award Nominee Joe Lambert (The Revenant).

A West Coast Tour with Austin TX Punk-a-billy Drive On Mak, took place in the Summer of 2016, with stops in Seattle, Olympia, San Jose, Los Angeles and Portland. The band shared the stage with Drive on Mak, as well as Portland up and comers the Welkin Dim.

In early 2017, the band parted ways with drummer David Cook, and Matt "The Machine" Bilderback moved from keys to full time drummer of the band. The band is currently a 5 piece with the addition of Nat Linville.

Other projects involving members of SixTwoSeven over time have included, Wheelchair, Five Hoss Cartwrights, Test Proof Positive, the Phil Bilderback Trio, Alpine Frequency, Victor Cutoff, Drive on Mak, Jason and the ArgoScotts, illfunk and MC MD, illfunk and DJ Mindbender, and Bork Laser

Musical Influences
The band has been known to describe their sound with the line "The attitude of an Underdog, with the punch of a champion". Bilderback is a self proclaimed MUSE and Foo Fighters fanatic, and influences can be heard in his music from Dinosaur Jr, Queens of the Stone Age, Weezer, Radiohead, and Royal Blood. They have been described as blue collar rock and roll band, with a heavy guitar riff driven sound not unlike that of AC/DC of stadium rock lore. The band has also described their sound as "A precisely measured combination of elements: Equal parts Punk, Grunge, Alt and Stadium Rock, with a dash of smashed computer parts and broken glass. Garage Filtered for your listening pleasure." Others say it is "Major League Rock and Roll."

Band members

Current 
 Greg Bilderback – lead guitar, lead vocals (2010–present)
 Mike Knapp – bass, backing vocals (2016–present)
 Matt Bilderback – drums, backing vocals (2017–present), Keyboards (2016)
 Jason Bilderback – guitar, backing vocals (2016–present)
 Nat Linville - guitar (2019–present)

Former 
 David Cook – Drums (2016-2017)

Pseudonyms
Greg "illfunk" Bilderback
Matt "the Machine" Bilderback
Jason "J Danger" Bilderback
Mike "MK Ultra" Knapp
Nathaniel "Natty Ice" Linville 
David "DC" Cook (Former)

Discography
Allow me for a moment...if you will...to be Frank - 2011 DubSeven Records
Wreckless Soul (Single) - Digital Only - 2016 DubSeven Records
Some Other's Day - 2016 - DubSeven Records
Some Other's Day (Deluxe Edition) - 2017 DubSeven Records
Heaven Knows / Runnin' with the Big Kids (single) - 2018 DubSeven Records
Already Gone / Dead on the Table (single) - 2018 DubSeven Records
New Solutions / A Winter in Palmyra (single) - 2018 DubSeven Records
Already Gone / Dead on the Table (LP) - 2018 DubSeven Records
The Mistrial / Motormouth (Single) - 2020 DubSeven Records
Small Craft Advisory / An Engineer's Lament - 2020 DubSeven Records
One Night Stand / Escape Clause - 2020 DubSeven Records

Songs
Patriot Song - Allow me for a moment...if you will...to be Frank - 2011 
My Game - Allow me for a moment...if you will...to be Frank - 2011 
Engineer's Lament - Allow me for a moment...if you will...to be Frank - 2011 
Down in Flames - Allow me for a moment...if you will...to be Frank - 2011 
Motormouth - Allow me for a moment...if you will...to be Frank - 2011 
Magnet - Allow me for a moment...if you will...to be Frank - 2011 
Time of Our Lives - Allow me for a moment...if you will...to be Frank - 2011
Nowhere to go but Up - Allow me for a moment...if you will...to be Frank - 2011
One Single Night - Some Other's Day - 2016
Wreckless Soul - Some Other's Day - 2016
Joshua's Song - Some Other's Day - 2016
Top of the World - Some Other's Day - 2016
Heaven Knows - Already Gone / Dead on the Table (LP) - 2018
My Game - Already Gone / Dead on the Table (LP) - 2018
Already Gone - Already Gone / Dead on the Table (LP) - 2018
Down in Flames - Already Gone / Dead on the Table (LP) - 2018
Nowhere to go but Up - Already Gone / Dead on the Table (LP) - 2018
Dead on the Table - Already Gone / Dead on the Table (LP) - 2018
Patriot Song - Already Gone / Dead on the Table (LP) - 2018
New Solutions - Already Gone / Dead on the Table (LP) - 2018
I Won't - Already Gone / Dead on the Table (LP) - 2018
Runnin' with the Big Kids - Already Gone / Dead on the Table (LP) - 2018
I'll Never Make it Home - Already Gone / Dead on the Table (LP) - 2018
Tiny Legs - Already Gone / Dead on the Table (LP) - 2018
A Winter in Palmyra - Already Gone / Dead on the Table (LP) - 2018
The Mistrial - The Mistrial / Motormouth (Single) - 2020
Motormouth - The Mistrial / Miotormouth (Single) - 2020
Small Craft Advisory - Small Craft Advisory / An Engineer's Lament (Single) - 2020
An Engineer's Lament - Small Craft Advisory / An Engineer's Lament (Single) - 2020
One Night Stand - One Night Stand / Escape Clause (Single) - 2020
Escape Clause - One Night Stand / Escape Clause (Single) - 2020
Dealer's Choice - (Unreleased)
My Fall - (Unreleased)
Day's of Our Lives - (Unreleased)
Golden Rule - (Unreleased)
War Mongers - (Unreleased)
Shots - 2020 - (Unreleased)
Refuse - 2020 (Unreleased)

Videos
Wreckless Soul - 2017 Some Other's Day - Directed by Greg Bilderback and Stephen Haughlum
New Solutions - 2018 Already Gone / Dead on the Table - Directed by Greg Bilderback and Amiah Bilderback
Patriot Song - 2018 Already Gone / Dead on the Table - Directed by Greg Bilderback
Dead on the Table - 2018 Already Gone / Dead on the Table - Directed by Greg Bilderback
The Mistrial - 2020 The Mistrial / Motormouth - Directed by Greg Bilderback
An Engineer's Lament (Halloween Horror Classic) - 2020 Small Craft Advisory / An Engineer's Lament - Directed by Greg Bilderback

Awards and nominations
ROSSI Award Nomination for Best Rock Band - 2017 Roswell Independent Film Festival - Roswell, NM

References

External links
 SixTwoSeven at Dubseven Records

21st-century American musicians
Alternative rock groups from Washington (state)
American post-grunge musical groups
Hard rock musical groups from Washington (state)
Musical groups established in 2016
Musical groups from Seattle
American art rock groups
American grunge groups
2016 establishments in Washington (state)